Evgeniya Olegovna Dmitrieva is a Russian actress. She appeared in over 140 films.

Biography
Evgeniya Dmitrieva was born on December 19, 1972 in Moscow. Since childhood, she was fond of theater and attended the theatrical studio of the Kozhukhov House of Creativity. She studied at the Mikhail Shchepkin Higher Theatre School, after which she became part of the troupe of the Maly Theatre. In 1995 she made her film debut.

Selected filmography

References

External links 
 Evgeniya Dmitrieva on kino-teatr.ru

1972 births
Living people
Actresses from Moscow
Russian film actresses
Russian television actresses
Russian stage actresses
20th-century Russian actresses
21st-century Russian actresses
Russian theatre directors